Høgskavlnasen Point is a point which forms the southern extremity of Høgskavlen Mountain in the Borg Massif of Queen Maud Land, Antarctica. It was mapped by Norwegian cartographers from surveys and air photos by the Norwegian–British–Swedish Antarctic Expedition (1949–52) and named Høgskavlnasen (the high snowdrift point).

References

Headlands of Queen Maud Land
Princess Martha Coast